The Asian Junior Athletics Championships (U20) (Asian Junior U20 Athletics Championships) are the Asian championships open for those of age according to junior. It is currently organized by the Asian Athletics Association.

Editions

Championship records

Men

Women

1Republic of China, commonly known as Taiwan, due to complicated relations with People's Republic of China, is recognized by the name Chinese Taipei by most of the international organizations in sports competitions. For more information, please see Cross-Strait relations.

Records in defunct events

Men's events

Women's events

Medals (1986-2018)

 Republic of China, commonly known as Taiwan, due to complicated relations with People's Republic of China, is recognized by the name Chinese Taipei by most of the international organizations in sports competitions. For more information, please see Cross-Strait relations.

Notes

See also
 Asian Youth Athletics Championships
 Asian Athletics Championships

References

India wins a gold and bronze in Asian Junior Athletics. Times of India (2010-07-02). Retrieved on 2010-08-29.
China dominates Asian junior sports meet as RI finishes 17th. The Jakarta Post (2010-06-16). Retrieved on 2010-08-29.

External links 
Asian Athletics Association
Championships Records

 
Junior
Under-20 athletics competitions
Continental athletics championships
Biennial athletics competitions